Mohammad-Reza Sharifinia (born 15 June 1955) is an Iranian actor and film producer .

Early life
Sharifinia was born on 15 June 1955 in Tehran, Iran. After graduating from the Faculty of Dramatic Arts, he married Iranian actress Azita Hajian. They've got two daughters called Mehraveh and Melika. Both Mehraveh Sharifinia  and Melika Sharifinia are actresses and have played in many important Persian series. In December 2010, and after nearly 20 years living separately, Sharifinia and Hajian filed for divorce.

Career
He began his acting career with Avinar (1991, S. Asadi), and has worked in many films as Producer, assistant director, cinematographer, casting director, and has acted in minor or major roles. He became famous after his acting in Imam Ali (1995, Mir Bagheri).

Political views
Sharifinia is an artist and film producer. He is one of the most popular artists in Iran.

Filmography

 The Actor, 1992
 Pari (aka. Angle), 1994
 Minou Watch-Tower, 1995
 Takhti, the World Champion
 The Snowman
 The Pear
 Tree, 1997
 Apartment, 1997 (TV series)
 Sheida,1999
 13 Cats On the Gable Roof, 2002
 The Lucky Bride, 2003
 Donya, 2004
 The Garden Salad, 2005
 Maxx, 2005
 Guest, 2007
 Marriage, Iranian Style, 2006
 Nesf Male Man, Nesf Male To, 2007
 Ekhrajiha 1, 2007
 Neghab, 2007
 Dayere Zangi, 2008
 Invitation (Davat), 2008
 Zanha Fereshte And, 2008
 SMS from another World, 2008 (TV series)
 ye eshtebahe koochooloo , 2008
 Ekhrajiha 2, 2009
 Superstar, 2009
 Pesar Tehrooni, 2009
 Malakoot , 2010
 Ekhrajiha 3, 2011
 Khaltour, 2017
 The Devil's Daughter, 2019
 Gando (TV series), 2019
 Angel Street Bride, 2021

References

External links

1955 births
Living people
Iranian male actors
Iranian male voice actors
Male actors from Tehran